The Marcy Houses, or The Marcy Projects, is a public housing complex built and operated by the New York City Housing Authority (NYCHA) and located in Bedford–Stuyvesant  and named after former Brooklyn politician and landowner/slaveowner William Learned Marcy, Brooklyn and is bordered by Flushing, Marcy, Nostrand and Myrtle avenues. The complex was named after William L. Marcy (1786–1857), a lawyer, soldier, and statesman.

Development 
The land Marcy is on was bought in 1945 by the City of New York; it had been the site of an old Dutch windmill. Homes and businesses (including two banks) were cleared for the construction of Marcy, as well as sections of Hopkins, Ellery, Floyd (now Martin Luther King Jr. Place), and Stockton streets that went through where the complex now sits. Marcy was completed on January 19, 1949.

Marcy has taken steps to become more environmentally friendly; in 2006, it replaced all conventional water heaters with energy-saving, instantaneous water heaters. In October 2008, Marcy's neighborhood garden earned 3rd place at the 43rd Annual Garden and Greening Awards Ceremony, and its evergreen garden earned second place. On January 19, 2009, the 60th anniversary of the building's completion, Mayor Michael Bloomberg proclaimed the day Marcy Houses Day.

See also 
New York City Housing Authority
List of New York City Housing Authority properties

References

External links 

Public housing in Brooklyn
Bedford–Stuyvesant, Brooklyn
Residential buildings completed in 1949
Residential buildings in Brooklyn